Robert Gerber is the United States Bankruptcy Court Judge from the Southern District of New York, who presided over the General Motors bankruptcy of June 2009. Gerber previously presided over the bankruptcy of Adelphia Communications Corporation and Ames Department Stores.

In 2012, a trust representing unsecured creditors of "old" GM filed a lawsuit (which came under Gerber's purview) against GM over payments made to hedge funds in 2009 in exchange for waiving of claims against GM's Canadian subsidiary. The deal, of which Gerber says he was unaware, could prompt a reopening of the 2009 case.

Gerber is currently presiding over the bankruptcy of LyondellBasell. The case has been ongoing since 2009. Though the company emerged from bankruptcy in 2010, claims of fraudulent conveyance by the litigation trust representing unsecured creditors against individual former shareholders, employees, and management of LyondellBasell are still pending as of early 2013. Motions to dismiss these claims were filed before Judge Gerber as early as 2009, but have not been ruled on by the Judge.

Prior to his appointment in 2000, he was a partner in the New York City law firm of Fried, Frank, Harris, Shriver & Jacobson, where he specialized in securities and commercial litigation and, thereafter, bankruptcy litigation and counseling.

Judge Gerber earned a B.S. degree from Rutgers University in 1967 and a J.D. degree from Columbia Law School in 1970.

References

Columbia Law School alumni
Living people
Judges of the United States bankruptcy courts
People associated with Fried, Frank, Harris, Shriver & Jacobson
Year of birth missing (living people)